Wilson Township is the name of some places in the U.S. state of Minnesota:
Wilson Township, Cass County, Minnesota
Wilson Township, Winona County, Minnesota

See also

 Wilson Township (disambiguation)

Minnesota township disambiguation pages